Wounded Game is a 1977 Soviet drama film directed by Nikolai Gubenko. It was entered into the 1977 Cannes Film Festival.

Cast
 Juozas Budraitis
 Aleksandr Kalyagin
 Zhanna Bolotova
 Rolan Bykov
 Bukhuti Zaqariadze
 Evgeni Evstigneev
 Aleksei Cherstvov 
 Nikolai Gubenko
 Georgi Burkov as Sergei Pogartsev
 Natalya Gundareva
 Olga Strogova
 Pantelejmon Krymov
 Zoya Yevseyeva
 Daniil Netrebin
 Lyudmila Shagalova

References

External links

1977 films
1977 drama films
1970s Russian-language films
Soviet drama films
Russian drama films
Films directed by Nikolai Gubenko